Microchlora eariasella is a species of snout moth in the genus Microchlora. It was described by George Hampson in 1901 and is known from the Malay Archipelago and Indonesia.

References

Moths described in 1901
Tirathabini
Taxa named by George Hampson